Buddenberg may refer to:
Guurtje Buddenberg, Dutch film producer
John Buddenberg (born 1965), American and Canadian football player
Joseph Buddenberg, animal rights activist
Michael Buddenberg, American football player
Wilhelm Buddenberg, former mayor of Nordhorn and association football player

See also
Budenberg
Budenberg Gauge Company
Michael Budenberg
Robin Budenberg
Michael Boddenberg